Mereworth is a village and civil parish near the town of Maidstone in Kent, England. The Wateringbury Stream flows through the village and powered a watermill, the site of which now lies within the grounds of Mereworth Castle.

Mereworth is pronounced as "Merry-worth".

History
In the early 18th century the Honourable John Fane – later 7th Earl of Westmoreland – inherited the manor. He had the Palladian mansion built. He also demolished the church, providing the villagers with a new Palladian-style replacement, now dedicated to St Lawrence. Mereworth Church is a Grade I listed building.

Notable people
Dominick Browne (1901-2002), 2nd Baron Mereworth, lived at Mereworth Castle until 1930.
Geoffrey Browne, 3rd Baron Oranmore and Browne (1861-1927), 2nd Baron Mereworth, lived at Mereworth Castle.
Francis Fane (1580-1629), peer, lived at Mereworth Castle.
John Fane (1685-1762), nobleman, built the present Mereworth Castle.
Richard Hosmer (1757-1820), cricketer, was born in Mereworth.
Charles Lucas VC (1834-1914), Rear-Admiral, is buried in the churchyard of St Lawrence's Church, Mereworth and was the first person to be awarded the Victoria Cross.

See also
Mereworth Sound, British Columbia, Canada

References

External links

Villages in Kent
Civil parishes in Kent